"All That I Need" is the third single from Irish boy band Boyzone's third studio album, Where We Belong (1998). It was written and produced by Carl Sturken and Evan Rogers with remix and additional production by Rude Boy, Andy Bradfield, Trevor Steel, and John Holliday. This made it their first original single release not to be co-written by any members of the group.

The song reached  1 in the UK Singles Chart in April 1998, selling 200,000 copies in the UK and earning a silver sales certification. Outside the UK, "All That I Need" reached No. 1 in Ireland and Taiwan and No. 7 in Sweden.

Track listings
UK CD1
 "All That I Need" (7-inch edit)
 "Never Easy"
 "Paradise"
 "Workin' My Way Back to You" (featuring Alliage)

UK CD2
 "All That I Need" (7-inch edit)
 "All That I Need" (Piz Danuk mix)
 "All That I Need" (Trouser Enthusiasts Darkest Day Dub No Sex Mix)
 "All That I Need" (Piz Danuk instrumental)

UK cassette single
 "All That I Need" (7-inch edit)
 "Never Easy"

Credits and personnel
Credits are lifted from the By Request album booklet.

Studio
 Recorded at The Loft (Bronxville, New York)

Personnel

 Evan Rogers – writing, additional background vocals, production, arrangement
 Carl Sturken – writing, all other instruments, production, arrangement
 John Holliday – Spanish guitar, additional production, programming
 Danny G – keyboard
 Colleen Reynolds – production management
 Andrea Derby – production assistant
 Andy Bradfield – remix
 Rude Boy – remix and additional production
 Trevor Steel – additional production, programming
 Al Hemberger – recording

Charts

Weekly charts

Year-end charts

Certifications

References

1998 singles
Boyzone songs
Irish Singles Chart number-one singles
Number-one singles in Scotland
Polydor Records singles
Songs written by Carl Sturken and Evan Rogers
UK Singles Chart number-one singles